Mazaeras conferta is a moth of the family Erebidae. It was described by Francis Walker in 1855. It is found in Espírito Santo, Brazil.

References

 

Phaegopterina
Moths described in 1855